Lanoka Harbor is an unincorporated community located within Lacey Township, in Ocean County, New Jersey, United States.

Murray Grove is a Unitarian-Universalist retreat and conference center in Lanoka Harbor, traditionally considered the site where Universalism in America began.

References

Lacey Township, New Jersey
Unincorporated communities in Ocean County, New Jersey
Unincorporated communities in New Jersey